Gaël Givet-Viaros (born 9 October 1981), known as Gaël Givet, is a French former professional footballer who played as a left-footed centre back and as a left-back. Givet was a UEFA Champions League runner-up with Monaco in 2004 and was part of the France national team which reached the 2006 FIFA World Cup Final.

Club career

Monaco
Born in Arles, France, Givet started his professional career at Monaco as a left-back before moving to centre-back. He made his debut in a 2–2 draw against Guingamp in December 2000. He played for Monaco between 2000 and 2007, making 178 league appearances and scoring eight goals. The highlights of his time at the club were winning the Coupe de la Ligue in 2003 and reaching the UEFA Champions League final in 2004, where he missed out on a winner's medal with a 3–0 defeat against José Mourinho's Porto. He played a pivotal role in their success, making 13 Champions League appearances during the campaign. He made a name for himself in the 2003–04 season where he blossomed in the Monaco defense alongside Patrice Evra, Julien Rodriguez and Sébastien Squillaci.

Marseille

After a successful career at Monaco, Givet moved to Marseille. During the 2007–08 season he featured 29 times in the French league and made nine appearances in the Champions League. At the beginning of the next season, however, he found his opportunities very limited in the first team.

Blackburn Rovers
On 10 January 2009, L'Équipe reported that Givet would be flying to England to finalize a six-month loan deal with English club Blackburn Rovers on 12 January. On 14 January, Sky Sports announced that Blackburn had completed the signing of Givet on a six-month loan deal with a view to a permanent move at the end of the season. This was confirmed by Marseille on 15 January. He appeared in his first match for Blackburn against Sunderland at the Stadium of Light, entering as a substitute in the FA Cup fourth round on 24 January 2009. The match finished 0–0, which resulted in a return fixture at Ewood Park on 4 February. Givet made his home debut in that match, which resulted in a 2–1 win for Blackburn. On 21 February 2009, he started and played the full 90 minutes against Manchester United at Old Trafford in a 2–1 defeat.

On 15 May 2009, an agreement in principle was made with Marseille to make his loan switch to Blackburn permanent. On 26 June 2009, Blackburn completed the signing of Givet on a four-year contract for £3.5 million. He scored his first goal in over three years against Sunderland on 22 August 2009 in a 2–1 away defeat. He scored his second goal for Rovers at home against Bolton Wanderers at Ewood Park on 21 February 2010 in a 3–0 victory. Following the 2009–10 season, Givet was awarded the Player's Player of the Year award by the club.

On 14 August 2010, Givet started and completed the full 90 minutes in the 1–0 win over Everton on the opening day of the new Premier League season. On 22 September 2010, he scored a volley from the edge of the area on 34 minutes against Aston Villa at Villa Park in the League Cup third round 3–1 defeat. On 13 November 2010, he scored a goal against Tottenham Hotspur at White Hart Lane and played the full 90 minutes at left-back in a 4–2 defeat. On 8 January 2011, he suffered a knee injury whilst playing in the FA Cup third round fixture against Queens Park Rangers in a 1–0 win for Rovers when he accidentally collided with Jamie Mackie and both players had to be stretchered off the field on around about the half-hour stage. In April 2011, Givet was left out of the squad as his future is in doubt after a £275,000 tax dispute with the club. At the end of the 2010–11 season, he made 32 appearances and scored two goals in all competitions.

On 24 August 2011, Givet made his first appearance of the 2011–12 season, playing the full 90 minutes against Sheffield Wednesday at Ewood Park in the second round of the League Cup. On 27 August, he started and played the full 90 minutes alongside Christopher Samba in a 1–0 defeat against Everton at Ewood Park. On 11 September, he started and played the full 90 minutes against Fulham in a 1–1 draw at Craven Cottage. On 17 September, he started the league game with Arsenal and completed the full 90 minutes at Ewood Park in a 4–3 victory in the left-back berth. On 20 September, he captained Rovers in their League Cup third round tie against Leyton Orient at Ewood Park which ended in a 3–2 win for Rovers and also played the full 90 minutes alongside Grant Hanley. On 24 September, Givet started and played the full 90 minutes against Newcastle United at St. James' Park in a 3–1 defeat. On 1 October 2011, he started and played the full 90 minutes at left-back in a 4–0 loss against Manchester City at Ewood Park. He was forced to leave the game against Sunderland on 11 December due to heart palpitations. Immediately suffering heart palpitations, Givet was taken to hospital and was to be monitored by club doctors, tested for an ongoing heart condition and the club are hopeful that the routine tests would show no problems. After suffering heart palpitations, manager Steve Kean recalled Givet suffering heart palpitations, told Givet to get off pitch before he collapsed and club doctor was unable to regulate heart beat.

Also in the match between Blackburn Rovers and Wigan Athletic, the second half was delayed due to Givet and paramedics were treating him. This was a scare, but thankfully they revealed it was because he had suffered a hamstring strain.

On 4 February 2012, Givet received a red card just two minutes before half-time after a challenge on Robin van Persie as Blackburn were heavily defeated by Arsenal, 7–1. Since his sending off, he did not make his first appearance and rumors began to spread that Kean had been leaving Givet out because of a contract clause but Kean dismissed them. Despite not on the bench for Blackburn in a 3–0 defeat to Swansea City, Kean revealed he did not choose Givet stating was "not in the right frame of mind" to play. Afterwards, Givet said that he wanted to leave Blackburn in the summer. On 21 April 2012, he, however, was selected to start against Norwich City at Ewood Park in the Premier League and played the full 90 minutes, replacing the injured Scottish defender Grant Hanley. On 7 May 2012, Givet started the Premier League game alongside Scott Dann against Wigan at Ewood Park in a crucial game knowing that a win would put them on course for survival, but during half-time, he suffered a heart scare after a row with manager Steve Kean and from being upset that Rovers were going down. He therefore was substituted for midfielder Radosav Petrović. The match finished 1–0 to Wigan, relegating Blackburn.

Arles-Avignon
On 20 August 2013, Givet made a return to his boyhood team Arles-Avignon after four-and-a-half years with Blackburn. He left the club in September 2014, signing for Evian Thonon Gaillard. However, after only one Ligue 1 game against his former team Marseille, he returned to Arles after falling out with Evian as they described his beard as "jihadist" and ordered him to shave it.

International career
Givet represented France at international level. He made his debut as a half-time substitute for Monaco clubmate and fellow debutant Sébastien Squillaci on 18 August 2004 in a 1–1 friendly draw with Bosnia-Herzegovina. In 2006, he was a member of the French squad that reached the Final of the FIFA World Cup held in Germany, though he did not play. He earned 12 caps for his country, last appearing on 16 August 2006.

Club career statistics

Honours
Monaco
Coupe de la Ligue: 2002–03
UEFA Champions League runner-up: 2003–04

France
FIFA World Cup runner-up: 2006

Individual
Ligue 1 Team of the Year: 2004–05

References

External links

 
 

1981 births
Living people
People from Arles
Sportspeople from Bouches-du-Rhône
French footballers
France international footballers
Association football defenders
AS Monaco FC players
Olympique de Marseille players
Blackburn Rovers F.C. players
AC Arlésien players
Thonon Evian Grand Genève F.C. players
Tours FC players
Ligue 1 players
Premier League players
English Football League players
Ligue 2 players
2006 FIFA World Cup players
French expatriate footballers
Expatriate footballers in England
French expatriate sportspeople in England
Footballers from Provence-Alpes-Côte d'Azur